Olivier Mukendi Mulaya (born 8 June 1991 in Kinshasa) is a Congolese-Belgian football striker who plays for Jeunesse Canach in the Luxembourg Division of Honour.

Career
Mukendi began his career in the youth from R. Union Saint-Gilloise and then joined Anderlecht, he trained first in the season 2007/2008 with the Jupiler League team from Anderlecht. He played his first profi game on 26 March 2009 against K.F.C. Germinal Beerschot for Anderlecht in the Jupiler League, he was the second youngest player in the playerpool for that game, the youngest being Romelu Lukaku. He is currently the top goalscorer in the reserve team from Anderlecht, he scored fifteen goals for the team, Mukendi is also the captain. On 26 May 2010 the 19-year-old forward extended his contract with RSC Anderlecht until 30 June 2012 and announced his movement on loan to Cercle Brugge.

International career
Mukendi presented Belgium on U-18 Level he played his first game 2007 and holds current four games, who scores one goal.

References

External links
 Profile on footgoal.net
 Sporza Profile
 

1991 births
Living people
Footballers from Kinshasa
Democratic Republic of the Congo footballers
R.S.C. Anderlecht players
Belgian Pro League players
Belgian footballers
Democratic Republic of the Congo emigrants to Belgium
Cercle Brugge K.S.V. players
Royale Union Saint-Gilloise players
Association football midfielders